Connie Carpenter-Phinney (born February 26, 1957) is an American retired racing cyclist and speed skater who won four medals in World Cycling Championship competitions (both road and track cycling) in the late 1970s and early 1980s. She also won the gold medal in the cycling road race at the 1984 Summer Olympics in Los Angeles, as well as twelve U.S. national championships. She remains the youngest American woman to compete at the Winter Olympics.

Early career 
Before turning to cycling, Carpenter was a speed skater, one of many athletes who excelled in both sports. As a speed skater, she competed in the 1972 Winter Olympics, where she finished 7th in the 1500m. She was fourteen years old at the time, making her the youngest American female Winter Olympian. Carpenter-Phinney trained with Norwegian coach Finn Halvorsen as part of the US National speed skating team that competed in the 1972 Olympics. Other members of the team included Anne Henning and Sheila Young (Ochowicz).

In 1976, she won the U.S. national overall outdoor title, but an injury prevented her from competing in the Olympics that year. After failing to make the Olympic team in 1976, Carpenter-Phinney began to focus on bicycle racing.

Outside of skating, while a student at the University of California, Berkeley, her athletic career centered on rowing.  She was a member of Cal's varsity for two seasons.  In 1979, her varsity team finished second nationally, and in 1980 she reached the top of the American collegiate rowing world with a national championship in the varsity four.

Cycling career 
Carpenter had trained on a bicycle during the skating off-season, and after the ankle injury in 1976, she began racing on the bike. 1976 was her first season of bicycle racing, and she won the US National Championship by beating former champion Mary Jane 'Miji' Reoch.  In 1977 and 1979, she also won the U.S. national road and track pursuit championships.  She added a pair of national criterium championships to her resume before winning the Olympic gold medal in 1984. 1984 was the first year women's cycling was part of the Olympics, previously it had only been a men's sport.  The race took place on July 29, 1984 and was 79 km. She won the race in a sprint over fellow American Rebecca Twigg and European competitors Jeannie Longo and Maria Canins.

Carpenter-Phinney was elected to the Wisconsin Athletic Hall of Fame in 2001 and is a member of both the U.S. Bicycling Hall of Fame and the U.S. Olympic Hall of Fame.  She was inducted into the Boulder  (Colorado) Sports Hall of Fame in 2011.

Personal life 
Carpenter-Phinney is married to fellow Olympic medalist and retired professional cyclist Davis Phinney, with whom she has two children, Taylor and Kelsey. As of 2015 She lived in Boulder, CO where she is an entrepreneur and also on the board of the Davis Phinney Foundation. Taylor competed at the 2008 and 2012 Olympics, the eighteen-year-old coming seventh in the individual pursuit. In London, Taylor earned fourth-place finishes in both the road race and individual time trial prior to his retirement in 2019.

Education
 BA Physical Education, University of California, Berkeley, 1981
 MS Kinesiology (University of Colorado) 1990

References

External links
 
 
 
 

1957 births
Living people
American female cyclists
American female speed skaters
American cycling road race champions
Cyclists at the 1984 Summer Olympics
Olympic gold medalists for the United States in cycling
Olympic speed skaters of the United States
Sportspeople from Madison, Wisconsin
Speed skaters at the 1972 Winter Olympics
University of California, Berkeley alumni
Olympic medalists in cycling
UCI Track Cycling World Champions (women)
Medalists at the 1984 Summer Olympics
American track cyclists
21st-century American women
Cyclists from Wisconsin